To Whom It May Concern... is the debut studio album by American hip hop group Freestyle Fellowship. It was released on October 5, 1991. The 30th anniversary reissue of To Whom It May Concern... received a nomination for Best Historical Album at the 65th Grammy Awards.

Critical reception

Scott Thill of AllMusic gave the album 4.5 stars out of 5, calling it "a potent glimpse into the subcultural, conscientious side of Los Angeles hip-hop, one that would later be eclipsed by gangsta boogie from the likes of Dr. Dre, Snoop Dogg, and all the pretenders who followed in their wake." Del F. Cowie of Exclaim! described it as "a mind-boggling collection of elastic rhymes, myriad flows and jazzy beats."

Writing for Classic Material: The Hip-Hop Album Guide, Oliver Wang said, "the album stands as one of the most influential LPs ever released on the West Coast, the fire starter for practically the entire California underground movement in the 1990s and beyond."

Track listing

References

External links
 

1991 debut albums
Freestyle Fellowship albums